Tatar-e Olya (also Romanized as Tātār-e ‘Olyā; also known as Tātār-e Bālā, Ţāţār Bāyjeq, and Ţāţār-e Bālā) is a city in Daland Rural District, in the Central District of Ramian County, Golestan Province, Iran. At the 2006 census, its population was 4,709, in 1,074 families.

References 

Populated places in Ramian County
Cities in Golestan Province